Fort Frederica National Monument, on St. Simons Island, Georgia, preserves the archaeological remnants of a fort and town built by James Oglethorpe between 1736 and 1748 to protect the southern boundary of the British colony of Georgia from Spanish raids.  About 630 British troops were stationed at the fort.

A town of up to 500 colonial residents had grown up outside the fort; it was laid out following principles of the Oglethorpe Plan for towns in the Georgia Colony.  The town was named Frederica, after Frederick, Prince of Wales, son of King George II. The monument was listed on the National Register of Historic Places on October 15, 1966.

History
In the early 18th century, Europeans called the land lying between British South Carolina and Spanish Florida the "Debatable Land". Today's state of Georgia was then the center of a centuries-old imperial conflict between Spain and Britain. After the philanthropist James Oglethorpe founded the colony of Georgia in 1733, to provide a place where poor debtors could settle, colonists from England and Scotland, and refugees from the German Electorate of the Palatinate built Fort Frederica in 1736 to defend their new territory. They named Frederica for Frederick, Prince of Wales, (1707–1751).  The name was feminized to distinguish it from Fort Frederick in South Carolina.

In the 1742 battles of Bloody Marsh and Gully Hole Creek, forces under Oglethorpe successfully repulsed Spanish attempts to invade St. Simons Island.  Afterward the Spanish no longer threatened the colony; in 1749 the government disbanded the garrison at Frederica.  Soon the village fell into economic decline, and by 1755 it was mostly abandoned.  The town survived a fire in 1758, but after a few more years, it was abandoned.  Naturalist William Bartram visited the site in March, 1774.  Though it was in ruins he noted that there was still a small garrison there.

Fort Frederica was documented and authorized as a National Monument on May 26, 1936, under the Franklin D. Roosevelt administration during the Great Depression. During this period, the Works Progress Administration (WPA) sponsored numerous surveys of historic areas and buildings across the country to identify, document and protect the resources for the future, as well as to provide employment.

Starting in 1947, the National Park Service and the Ft. Frederica Association, a citizens' interest group, sponsored a series of archaeological investigations at the Frederica site.  Using information from 18th-century maps and journals as guides, the archaeologists excavated sections of the fort and village.  By correlating the archaeological data with the historic documents and excavating remains of structures, the archaeologists have provided important insight into Frederica's past and colonial history, a complex time of international rivalries.

As a historic area under the National Park Service, the National Monument was listed on the National Register of Historic Places on October 15, 1966.  Fort Frederica is open to the public and admission is free.

Gallery

Related sites

 Fort Argyle
 Battle of Bloody Marsh
 Battle of Gully Hole Creek
 Castillo de San Marcos National Monument
 Fort Caroline National Memorial
 Fort King George
 Fort Matanzas National Monument
 Fort Morris State Historic Site
 Wormsloe Historic Site
 Oglethorpe Plan
 List of national monuments of the United States

Footnotes

References
 The National Parks: Index 2001–2003. Washington: U.S. Department of the Interior.

External links
 Official NPS website: Fort Frederica National Monument
 Archeology at Fort Frederica National Monument
  "Frederica: An 18th-Century Planned Community", a National Park Service Teaching with Historic Places (TwHP) lesson plan
 Fort Frederica historical marker
 

Government buildings completed in 1748
Infrastructure completed in 1748
Archaeological sites in Georgia (U.S. state)
Frederica
National Park Service National Monuments in Georgia (U.S. state)
History of the Thirteen Colonies
Military and war museums in Georgia (U.S. state)
Museums in Glynn County, Georgia
Archaeological museums in Georgia (U.S. state)
Protected areas established in 1936
Frederica
Frederica
Protected areas of Glynn County, Georgia
Frederica
1736 establishments in the Thirteen Colonies
Historic districts on the National Register of Historic Places in Georgia (U.S. state)
National Register of Historic Places in Glynn County, Georgia
Former county seats in Georgia (U.S. state)
St. Simons, Georgia